Abu Minqar is an oasis town in Qesm Al Wahat Ad Dakhlah District, New Valley Governorate, Egypt, about  by road southwest of Farafra. It is inhabited mainly by Bedouins and lies along a  historical caravan route to Kufra, Libya.

History and archaeology
Abu Minqar lay on the very edge of Roman Egypt. There are still probable traces of the Romans in the area, including two ruined brick buildings and two well shafts.

The German explorer Gerhard Rohlfs explored the Abu Minqar area and surrounding desert of western Egypt in 1874-1875, and in 1898 it was explored by Wildred Jennings-Bramly and W. J. Harding King.

In the area is the Valley of Shells (Wadi el-Khawaka), which is known for its prehistoric sea-shells. A potsherd with plant imprints of the Panicum turgidum species dated to between 5716 and 46 BC has been unearthed at a middle Holocene site near Abu Minqar.

Geography and geology

Geologically, the area forms part of the Dakhla—Abu Minqar plateau in a shallow depression between the Kharga and Dakhla depressions, with an elevation typically of between 400 and 500 metres above sea level. The Abu Minqar Depression is often considered to be the extreme western subdivision of the Dakhla Depression. Maastrichtian-Danian period sediments are found at Abu Minqar.

References

Populated places in New Valley Governorate
Oases of Egypt